David Legrand (born 24 February 1972) is a French wrestler. He competed in the men's freestyle 52 kg at the 1996 Summer Olympics.

References

1972 births
Living people
French male sport wrestlers
Olympic wrestlers of France
Wrestlers at the 1996 Summer Olympics
People from Boulogne-sur-Mer
Sportspeople from Pas-de-Calais